Tricheilostoma is a genus of snakes in the family Leptotyphlopidae. All of the species were previously placed in the genus Leptotyphlops.

The genus contains the following species:

 Tricheilostoma bicolor, two-colored blind snake 
 Tricheilostoma broadleyi
 Tricheilostoma dissimilis, Sudan blind snake 
 Tricheilostoma greenwelli
 Tricheilostoma kongoensis
 Tricheilostoma sundewalli, Sundevall's worm snake

References

 
Snake genera